Jacob Johannis  was a Swedish prelate who was Bishop of Skara from 1569 till 1595. In 1593 he was formally deposed from his role as bishop of Skara however he retained the title till 1595.

References

Bishops of Skara
16th-century Swedish people